The Ministry of Health of Moldova is one of the fourteen ministries of the Government of Moldova. The current health minister is Ala Nemerenco.

Ministers

References

Health
Moldova
Moldova, Health